Lazhar may refer to:
Monsieur Lazhar and the titular character, Bachir Lazhar
Lazhar Hadj Aïssa (born 1984), Algerian footballer
Lazhar Bououni (1948–2017), Tunisian politician
Lazhar Karoui Chebbi (born 1927)
Lazhar Ben Mohamed Tlil